The first season of Desperate Housewives, an American television series created by Marc Cherry, commenced airing in the United States on October 3, 2004, concluded May 22, 2005, and consisted of 23 episodes. It tells the story of Mary Alice Young, a seemingly perfect housewife who commits suicide, fearing that a dark secret, involving her, her husband, and their son would be exposed. At her wake, Mary Alice's four close friends and the main characters, Susan Mayer, Lynette Scavo, Bree Van de Kamp and Gabrielle Solis, are introduced.  All of them live in the suburb of Fairview on Wisteria Lane. Narrating the series from the grave, Mary Alice describes how her friends try to find out the reason for her suicide, while trying to deal with the problems of their personal lives.

Desperate Housewives''' first season aired in the United States (U.S.) on Sundays at 9:00 pm ET on ABC, a terrestrial television network. In addition to the 23 regular episodes, a special, Sorting Out the Dirty Laundry, aired on April 24, 2005. The season garnered an average of 23.7 million viewers in the U.S. per all 23 episodes, ranking as the fourth most-watched television series during the 2004–05 American television season. In the United Kingdom, the season premiered on Channel 4 on January 5, 2005, and subsequently aired Wednesdays at 10 pm on the network. It aired in Canada on CTV Television Network and in Australia on the Seven Network.

The season was released on DVD as a six-disc box set under the title of Desperate Housewives – The Complete First Season on September 20, 2005 by Buena Vista Home Entertainment in Region 1, in Region 2 on October 10, 2005, and in Region 4 on November 28, 2005. The season is also available for purchase by registered users on the U.S. iTunes Store.

 Production 

Marc Cherry wrote the script for the Housewives pilot and his agent appealed it to six networks, (CBS, NBC, Fox, HBO, Showtime and Lifetime) only to have all of them turn it down. Later, after his previous agent was arrested for embezzlement, he hired a team of new agents, who saw the script "as a soap opera with dark comedy in it". After Cherry edited parts of the pilot script and pitched it to ABC, network executives were impressed, causing ABC to order 13 episodes. Filming for the season started around March 2004 at the Universal Studios Hollywood backlot Colonial Street.

This season was produced by Touchstone Television (now ABC Studios) and Cherry Productions and aired on the ABC network. The executive producers were Cherry, Michael Edelstein, Charles Pratt Jr., and Tom Spezialy with Pratt Jr., Chris Black, Oliver Goldstick, Joey Murphy, and John Pardee serving as consulting producers. The staff writers were Cherry, Goldstick, Spezialy, Pardee, Murphy, and Black; producers Alexandra Cunningham, Tracey Stern, and Patty Lin; co-executive producer Kevin Murphy, Jenna Bans, David Schulner, Adam Barr, Katie Ford, and Joshua Senter. Regular directors throughout the season included Charles McDougall, Arlene Sanford, Larry Shaw, Jeff Melman, Fred Gerber, David Grossman, and John David Coles. Its orchestral score was composed by Steve Bartek and Steve Jablonsky, while the series' theme was composed by Danny Elfman. Cherry also served as the season's show runner.

 Cast 

Regular cast
Starring
Teri Hatcher as Susan Mayer 
Felicity Huffman as Lynette Scavo 
Marcia Cross as Bree Van de Kamp
Eva Longoria as Gabrielle Solis 
Nicollette Sheridan as Edie Britt
Steven Culp as Rex Van de Kamp 
Ricardo Antonio Chavira as Carlos Solis 
Mark Moses as Paul Young
Andrea Bowen as Julie Mayer 
Jesse Metcalfe as John Rowland 
Cody Kasch as Zach Young
Brenda Strong as Mary Alice Young
and James Denton as Mike Delfino

Recurring
Brent Kinsman as Preston Scavo 
Shane Kinsman as Porter Scavo 
Doug Savant as Tom Scavo
Zane Huett as Parker Scavo 
Joy Lauren as Danielle Van de Kamp 
Shawn Pyfrom as Andrew Van de Kamp
Harriet Sansom Harris as Felicia Tilman
Christine Estabrook as Martha Huber
Roger Bart as George Williams
Lupe Ontiveros as Juanita "Mama" Solis
Lucille Soong as Yao Lin
Ryan Carnes as Justin
Bob Gunton as Noah Taylor
Sam Lloyd as Dr. Albert Goldfine
Richard Roundtree as Mr. Shaw
Pat Crawford Brown as Ida Greenberg
Lesley Ann Warren as Sophie Bremmer
Richard Burgi as Karl Mayer
Jeff Doucette as Father Crowley

Guest
Terry Bozeman as Dr. Lee Craig
Mehcad Brooks as Matthew Applewhite
Nick Chinlund as Detective Sullivan
Kathryn Joosten as Karen McCluskey
Alfre Woodard as Betty Applewhite 

The first season features a cast of thirteen actors who receive star billing. Brenda Strong narrated the series as the deceased Mary Alice Young. Teri Hatcher portrayed Susan Mayer, the klutzy, lovable divorced mother in search of love. Felicity Huffman played Lynette Scavo, a former career woman who is now a full-time mother of four. Marcia Cross acted as Bree Van de Kamp, the uptight, perfectionist homemaker and mother of two teenagers who is struggling to save her marriage. Eva Longoria starred as Gabrielle Solis, the materialistic ex–fashion model who cheats on her husband. Nicollette Sheridan played the neighborhood slut and Susan's rival, Edie Britt. Steven Culp played Rex Van de Kamp, Bree's emasculated, sexually dissatisfied husband. Ricardo Antonio Chavira starred as Gabrielle's neglectful, high-powered executive husband, Carlos Solis. Mark Moses portrayed Mary Alice's mysterious widower, Paul Young. Andrea Bowen played Susan's knowledgeable, level-headed daughter, Julie Mayer. Jesse Metcalfe played the Solis' gardener and Gabrielle's adulterous lover, John Rowland. Cody Kasch played Mary Alice's and Paul's troubled and mentally unstable son Zach Young, and James Denton portrayed the neighborhood plumber and Susan's love interest, Mike Delfino, who has a secret of his own.

Numerous supporting characters have been given expansive and recurring appearances in the progressive storyline. Doug Savant played Tom Scavo, Lynette's husband who is often away on business; Savant later became a series regular. Shawn Pyfrom appeared as Bree and Rex's rebellious and headstrong son Andrew Van de Kamp. Kathryn Joosten acted as Karen McCluskey, Lynette's neighbor across the street, and Christine Estabrook portrayed the neighborhood  Martha Huber.

 Reception 

 Viewership and reviews 
The pilot episode, which aired on October 3, 2004, garnered 21.6 million viewers, ranking first in its time slot of 9:00 pm Eastern Time Zone (ET) (8:00 pm Central Time Zone (Americas) [CT]). It was the most-viewed ABC season premiere since 1996's Spin City. After airing three episodes of Desperate Housewives, ABC picked the series up for a full season. Overall, the first season averaged 23.7 million viewers for the 23 episodes aired in the U.S., including the season's largest audience of more than 30 million viewers of the season finale. Of the regular primetime programming that aired during the 2004–2005 American television season, Desperate Housewives ranked 4th out of 156 programs, according to the Nielsen Ratings system.

Critical reception was overwhelmingly positive, and Housewives was considered the breakout hit of the season. Robert Bianco of USA Today gave the pilot a score of four stars out of four, calling it "[r]efreshingly original, bracingly adult and thoroughly delightful", and going on to say that "[Desperate] Housewives is a brightly colored, darkly comic take on suburban life, sort of Knots Landing meets The Golden Girls by way of Twin Peaks." Tim Goodman of the San Francisco Chronicle thought that Desperate Housewives was "a brilliantly conceived and relentlessly entertaining new drama". Matthew Gilbert of The Boston Globe commented that the series had "marvelous tonal elasticity". Peter Schorn of IGN felt that season one was "blessed with an attractive cast (sing the praises of older women!), sharp writing and a funky vibe of its own" and that "Desperate Housewives was able to take some of the oldest formulas in the book and infuse them with their own subversive twists to whip up a frothy confection of sly wit and dark motives." Schorn gave the season a score of 9 out of 10.

Some critics were not as enthusiastic, however. On reviewing the DVD release of the season, Entertainment Weekly's Dalton Ross gave it a B+ grade, selecting the pilot, "Who's That Woman?", "Guilty", "Children Will Listen" and the season finale "One Wonderful Day" as the season's best episodes, and "Suspicious Minds", "Your Fault" and "Love is in the Air" as the season's worst. Heather Havrilesky of Salon.com felt that after a few episodes, "this dark exploration of the lives of women has not only slid quickly into clichés, but the acting feels forced and overplayed, the stories are wildly unrealistic, the direction is stuck in some awkward nowhereland between campy and leaden, and the voice-over is so grating and so peskily imitative of Sex and the City that the whole package is almost unwatchable."

 Awards 

Season one was nominated for fifteen Primetime Emmy Awards, winning six. They were in the categories of Outstanding Single-Camera Picture Editing for a Comedy Series, Outstanding Main Title Theme Music which was awarded Danny Elfman, Outstanding Lead Actress in a Comedy Series which was awarded to Felicity Huffman for her portrayal of Lynette Scavo, Outstanding Guest Actress in a Comedy Series which was awarded to Kathryn Joosten for her portrayal of Mrs. McCluskey, Outstanding Directing for a Comedy Series which was awarded to Charles McDougall and Outstanding Casting for a Comedy Series. Teri Hatcher picked up a Golden Globe Award in the category of Best Performance by an Actress in a Television Series – Musical or Comedy for her portrayal of Susan Mayer. The season received four other Golden Globe nominations, winning one for Best Television Series – Musical or Comedy. The season also won two Screen Actors Guild Awards; one was awarded to Teri Hatcher in the category Outstanding Performance by a Female Actor in a Comedy Series and the other was under the category of Outstanding Performance by an Ensemble in a Comedy Series.

 Episodes 

DVD release

 References 

 External links 

 
 Desperate Housewives episode list at ABC.com Desperate Housewives episode guide at Channel 4.com''

 
2004 American television seasons
2005 American television seasons